Ioan Halmoș (born 1901, date of death unknown) was a Romanian footballer who played as a midfielder.

International career
Ioan Halmoș played one friendly match for Romania, on 10 June 1923 under coach Teofil Morariu in a 2–1 loss against Yugoslavia at the 1923 King Alexander's Cup.

References

External links
 

1901 births
Year of death missing
Romanian footballers
Romania international footballers
Place of birth missing
Association football midfielders
Liga I players
Banatul Timișoara players